Too Late for Tears is a 1949 film noir directed by Byron Haskin and starring Lizabeth Scott,  Arthur Kennedy, Dan Duryea, and Don DeFore. It concerns a ruthless femme fatale's murderous attempt to hold on to a suitcase containing US$60,000 ($ in ) that does not belong to her. The screenplay was written by Roy Huggins, developed from a serial he wrote for the Saturday Evening Post.

The film was reissued as Killer Bait in 1955. Too Late for Tears has been in the public domain for many years; there are several different edits of the film with different running times. On January 25, 2014, a restored 35mm print was premiered by the Film Noir Foundation at Noir City 12 at the Castro Theatre in San Francisco. The film was restored by UCLA Film and Television Archive and the Film Noir Foundation, with the Hollywood Foreign Press Association providing some of the necessary funding. The restoration combined 35mm dupe negative elements from France with some material from surviving 35mm and 16mm prints.

Plot

Jane and Alan Palmer are a married Los Angeles couple. Jane comes from a middle-class family and desperately longs for an upper-class lifestyle. Alan is Jane's second husband; her first killed himself when he could not meet Jane's needs. The same tensions are brewing within Jane and Alan's marriage, as Alan makes a comfortable but unexceptional salary. In the back roads of the Hollywood Hills late one night, Jane has just convinced Alan to skip out on a party hosted by a wealthy friend. As they turn the car around, a second car drives by and throws a heavy bag into the back seat. The bag is full of money. A third car chases them, but Jane drives to safety. She begs Alan to keep the money, but he assumes that it is the proceeds of a crime. To placate his wife, Alan checks the bag into Union Station while they decide whether to keep it or turn it over to the authorities. 

A man named Danny Fuller appears at the Palmer apartment while Alan is at work. He makes it clear that he was the intended recipient of the money, and threatens her for it. She casually invents a series of lies to explain why she does not have it, eventually agreeing to give him half. When Alan makes it clear that he intends to turn over the money, Jane concocts a plan to get it. She arranges a date with Alan at the pleasure boating lake where they first met, and asks Danny to meet her there. On the boat, Alan finds that Jane has brought his pistol along. They struggle for the gun, a shot rings out, and Alan collapses dead in the boat. Danny hops aboard, puts on Alan's coat and hat, and helps Jane weigh down the body in the lake. Jane lies again to Danny and tells him that they money is hidden in the countryside. She takes him there in an attempt to kill him, but he sees through the ruse and leaves. Jane then leaves her car at a beach, staging it to make it seem as though Alan ran off to Mexico.

Jane reports Alan missing to the police, deeply troubling Alan's sister Kathy, who lives next door. She realizes that the claim ticket for the bag is missing and assumes that Alan has it. In truth, Kathy has taken it while looking around Jane's apartment for clues to Alan's location. An amicable stranger, Don Blake, arrives looking for Alan. He claims to have served in the Air Force with Alan and resolves to find him when he hears that he has gone missing. Jane realizes that Kathy has the ticket and has become suspicious of her. She pressures Danny into buying a poison with which to quietly kill her. As Don and Kathy are about to leave for a date, Jane invites them into her apartment and proves that Don did not serve with Alan. She holds Kathy and Don at gunpoint, retrieves the ticket, and pistol-whips Don unconscious. Kathy calls the police and begs them to monitor Union Station for Jane, but they refuse, having no evidence that a crime has been committed. 

Jane retrieves the bag. A drunk and depressed Danny confesses that the money is a blackmail payoff intended to keep him quiet about a large insurance scam. Jane kills him with the poison, then flees to Mexico. The police are convinced that Danny's death is a suicide, but Don is not. He tracks Jane down in a Mexican resort, where she now lives in luxury. He tricks her into thinking that he knows that Alan was murdered, coaxing a confession out of her in the form of another payoff. Don then reveals that he is the brother of her first husband and suspects that she killed him too. The Mexican police burst into the room, and Jane accidentally falls to her death. Don finds Kathy (now his wife) in the hotel lobby, and they decide to end their "honeymoon" early.

Cast
 Lizabeth Scott as Jane Palmer
 Don DeFore as Don Blake/Blanchard
 Dan Duryea as Danny Fuller
 Arthur Kennedy as Alan Palmer
 Kristine Miller as Kathy Palmer
 Barry Kelley as Lieutenant Breach

Reception

Critical response
When the film was released The New York Times wrote:

Film critic Dennis Schwartz in 2005 wrote a favorable review:

See also
 List of films in the public domain in the United States

References

External links

 
 
 
 
 
 
  (complete)

1949 films
1940s crime thriller films
American crime thriller films
American black-and-white films
1940s English-language films
Film noir
Films directed by Byron Haskin
Films set in Los Angeles
United Artists films
1940s American films